Steinar Karlstrøm (born 8 April 1965) is a Norwegian politician for the Labour Party.

He served as a deputy representative to the Parliament of Norway from Finnmark during the term 2017–2021. He hails from Alta.

References

1965 births
Living people
People from Alta, Norway
Deputy members of the Storting
Labour Party (Norway) politicians
Finnmark politicians